California Solo is an American independent feature film written and directed by Marshall Lewy and starring Robert Carlyle. It made its world premiere at the 2012 Sundance Film Festival, and its international premiere at the 2012 Edinburgh Film Festival.  The film was acquired by Strand Releasing for the U.S., and was given a limited theatrical release on November 30, 2012.

Plot
Robert Carlyle plays Lachlan MacAldonich, a former Britpop rocker-turned-agricultural worker, who gets caught driving drunk and faces deportation after living in Los Angeles for 12 years.  His efforts to stay in the U.S. force him to confront his past and current demons. The film addresses immigration issues, alcoholism, and personal redemption.

Cast

Main cast

Supporting cast

Cameo/uncredited cast
 Peter Christian as Background Lawyer
 Sean Keehan as Parolee
 George Steeves as Guitar Shop Patron
 Robert Stilwell as Brunch Patron
 Khai Thach as Market Vendor

Production
Lewy wrote the part of Lachlan MacAldonich with Robert Carlyle in mind. Carlyle has remarked, "It was an easy sell to get me to do it" and he drew inspiration for the character from his friends, the Gallagher brothers of Oasis.

The film shot for 21 days in June 2011 in Leona Valley, Lancaster, Moorpark, and many neighborhoods of Los Angeles, including Silver Lake, Los Feliz, Atwater Village, Sun Valley, Downtown, Highland Park, Hollywood, and Culver City.  Its title song was written specifically for the film by Adam Franklin.

Reception and awards
"California Solo" is a New York Times Critics Pick.
Critics have praised Robert Carlyle's performance, calling it "open and utterly human", "effortlessly engaging", "soulful and layered", and "stunning...perhaps his best since Trainspotting’s Begbie".  The Huffington Post called the film a "touching drama" and The Hollywood Reporter called it a "fragile drama with emotional heft."

The film won the Best Narrative Feature and Best Editing awards at the 2012 Woodstock Film Festival.  Robert Carlyle won the Outstanding Acting Award at the 2012 Tallgrass Film Festival.  Additionally, producer Mynette Louie won the 2013 Independent Spirit Awards' Piaget Producers Award.  In May 2013, Savannah Lathem won the Young Artist Award for Best Supporting Young Actress in a Feature Film.

References

External links
 
 
 

2012 films
2012 drama films
Films set in Los Angeles
Films shot in California
American independent films
2012 independent films
American drama films
2010s English-language films
2010s American films